Asura cylletona is a moth of the family Erebidae first described by Charles Swinhoe in 1893. It is found in Myanmar.

References

cylletona
Moths described in 1893
Moths of Asia